La Marina Wildlife Rescue Center, or La Marina Zoo is an animal rescue centre located 8.5 km northeast of Ciudad Quesada, between Palmera and Aguas Zarcas, in the Alajuela Province of Costa Rica.  The centre is dedicated to the rehabilitation of mistreated, injured, orphaned, and/or confiscated animals. Once the animals are fully rehabilitated, they are reintroduced into their natural habitats in protected areas within Costa Rica, primarily in the Parque Nacional Juan Castro Blanco to the south of the centre.

See also 
 List of zoos by country: Costa Rica zoos

References

Animal reintroduction
Buildings and structures in Alajuela Province
Wildlife rehabilitation and conservation centers
Tourist attractions in Alajuela Province
Zoos in Costa Rica